The Îles Tuamotu-Gambier ( or Archipels des Tuamotu et des Gambier or Archipel des Tuamotu-Gambier or Tuamotu-Gambier or officially subdivision administrative des (Îles) Tuamotu-Gambier) is an administrative division in French Polynesia. It consists of the Tuamotus and the Gambier Islands which are geographically located closely together.

Because of a difference between administrative districts and electoral circumscriptions on the Îles Tuamotu-Gambier, French Polynesia has 5 administrative subdivisions, but 6 electoral districts/electoral circumscriptions. It has an area of 726.5 square kilometers and an estimated population of 16,881 people according to data from 2017.

Administrative division 
Administratively, the Îles Tuamotu-Gambier form one of the 5 administrative subdivisions (subdivision administratives) of French Polynesia, the administrative subdivision of the Tuamotu-Gambier (Islands) (subdivision administrative des (Îles) Tuamotu-Gambier) with 17 communes: The 16 communes Anaa, Arutua, Fakarava, Fangatau, Hao, Hikueru, Makemo, Manihi, Napuka, Nukutavake, Puka-Puka, Rangiroa, Reao, Takaroa-Takapoto, Tatakoto and Tureia of the Tuamotus and the commune Gambier, comprising the Gambier Islands, the Acteon Group, and a few atolls.

Electoral divisions 
Whereas all other 4 administrative subdivisions (subdivisions administratives) of French Polynesia are at the same time also electoral districts/electoral circumscriptions (circonscriptions électorales) for the Assembly of French Polynesia (Assemblée de la Polynésie française), the Îles Tuamotu-Gambier are the only administrative district of French Polynesia that is not identical with an electoral district/electoral circumscription, but consists of 2 different electoral districts/electoral circumscriptions for the Assembly of French Polynesia.

These 2 electoral districts/electoral circumscriptions (circonscriptions électorales) are:

 electoral circumscription of the Gambier Islands and the Islands Tuamotu-East (circonscription des Îles Gambier et Tuamotu Est) with 12 communes: The commune Gambier on the Gambier Islands and the 11 communes Anaa, Fangatau, Hao, Hikueru, Makemo, Napuka, Nukutavake, Pukapuka, Reao, Tatakoto and Tureia in the eastern part of the Tuamotus.
 electoral circumscription of the Islands Tuamotu-West (circonscription des Îles Tuamotu Ouest) with the 5 communes Arutua, Fakarava, Manihi, Rangiroa and Takaroa in the western part of the Tuamotus.

See also 
 French overseas departments and territories
 Administrative divisions of France

External links 
 Official site of the administrative subdivision of the Îles Tuamotu-Gambier

Tuamotus
Gambier Islands
Geography of French Polynesia